Bahçe (literally "garden") is a Turkish place name that may refer to the following places in Turkey:

 Bahçe, Bismil
 Bahçe, Horasan
 Bahçe, Osmaniye, a rural district and town of Osmaniye Province
 Bahçe, Karataş, a village in the district of Karataş, Adana Province
 Bahçe, Silifke, a village in the district of Silifke, Mersin Province
 Bahçe, Silvan